Manuel David Milinković (born 20 May 1994) is a French professional footballer who plays as a winger.

Club career
Born in Antibes, France, Milinković has Serbian origins. His grandfather Mirko came to France from the outskirts of Sarajevo. Already in France, David's father Igor was born. He worked at Partus Corporation, a company dedicated to casinos, hotels, thermal centers, restaurants, and so on. Mirko's grandson, Igor's son, David, started playing football in the youth team of AS Cannes.

During the winter transfer window of the 2011–12 season he moved to Serbia and joined the youth team of Red Star Belgrade. He then joined FK Rad, who loaned him to third level side FK BASK in the 2012–13 winter-break. In summer 2013 he joined BASK permanently and played with them until the winter-break of the 2014–15 season.

Then he moved to Italy, where, after a short time spent in A.S. Roma, he joined Ternana Calcio, playing with them in the second half of the 2014–15 Serie B season. In summer 2015, he joined another Serie B side, Salernitana.

In the winter-break of the 2015–16 season, he signed with Genoa C.F.C. which immediately loaned him to Serie B side Virtus Lanciano where he played the second half of the 2015–16 Serie B. In summer 2016, Genoa loaned him to Messina playing in the Lega Pro, before signing a season long loan with the Scottish side Heart of Midlothian F.C. in 2017.

On 9 July 2018, he signed a three-year deal, with an option for an additional year, with English side Hull City. He made his debut in the first match of the 2018–19 season on 6 August 2018 at home to Aston Villa, coming off the bench as a 67th-minute substitute for Todd Kane, in a 1–3 defeat.

He was acquired on a one-year loan, with an option to buy, by Canadian Major League Soccer side Vancouver Whitecaps FC on 27 January 2020, for their 2020 season. On 1 February 2021 the loan was made permanent with the triggering of a clause in his loan contract. However, on 2 February 2021, it was announced that Milinković and the Whitecaps FC mutually agreed to part ways.

On 31 August 2021, he returned to Italy and ACR Messina, signing a two-year deal.

Career statistics

References

1994 births
Living people
People from Antibes
French footballers
Association football midfielders
FK Rad players
FK BASK players
Ternana Calcio players
U.S. Salernitana 1919 players
Genoa C.F.C. players
S.S. Virtus Lanciano 1924 players
A.C.R. Messina players
Calcio Foggia 1920 players
Heart of Midlothian F.C. players
Hull City A.F.C. players
Vancouver Whitecaps FC players
Serie B players
Serie C players
Scottish Professional Football League players
English Football League players
French expatriate footballers
Expatriate footballers in England
Expatriate footballers in Italy
Expatriate footballers in Scotland
French expatriate sportspeople in England
French expatriate sportspeople in Italy
French expatriate sportspeople in Scotland
French people of Serbian descent
Major League Soccer players
Russian expatriate sportspeople in Monaco